The 2018 Andalusian regional election was held on Sunday, 2 December 2018, to elect the 11th Parliament of the autonomous community of Andalusia. All 109 seats in the Parliament were up for election.

As a result of the previous election, the Spanish Socialist Workers' Party of Andalusia (PSOE–A) was able to retain power after obtaining confidence and supply support from Citizens (Cs), with such alliance enduring President Susana Díaz's defeat in the 2017 PSOE leadership election. The PSOE–Cs agreement broke up in September 2018 after Cs withdrew their support from Díaz's government, prompting Díaz to announce the Parliament's dissolution on 8 October and call a snap election for 2 December 2018.

Registered turnout was the second lowest in any Andalusian regional election, only behind that of 1990. The PSOE–A remained the most voted party but suffered an unforeseen setback, dropping from 47 to 33 seats. A far-right party, Vox, gained parliamentary representation in a regional parliament in Spain for the first time since the country's transition to democracy, benefiting from a collapse in the People's Party (PP) vote which saw it nearly tied in votes with Cs. For the first time in the electoral history of Andalusia, right-of-centre parties commanded an absolute majority of seats in the Parliament of Andalusia, allowing a non-Socialist government to take power in the region after 36 years of uninterrupted PSOE rule.

Subsequently, PP and Cs formed a coalition government with Vox support, electing Juan Manuel Moreno as its president. This cooperation between the centre-right and the far-right (including a centrist conservative-liberal party which had supported a center-left government in the prior Andalusian parliament) was widely seen as breaking the cordon sanitaire that most mainstream parties in other European countries had maintained up until that time against parties like the Front National (France), AfD (Germany) or the Sweden Democrats, while paving the way for similar agreements between all three PP, Cs and Vox being reached in other autonomous communities and municipalities following the 2019 local and regional elections.

Overview

Electoral system
The Parliament of Andalusia was the devolved, unicameral legislature of the autonomous community of Andalusia, having legislative power in regional matters as defined by the Spanish Constitution of 1978 and the regional Statute of Autonomy, as well as the ability to vote confidence in or withdraw it from a regional president.

Voting for the Parliament was on the basis of universal suffrage, which comprised all nationals over 18 years of age, registered in Andalusia and in full enjoyment of their political rights. Additionally, Andalusians abroad were required to apply for voting before being permitted to vote, a system known as "begged" or expat vote. The 109 members of the Parliament of Andalusia were elected using the D'Hondt method and a closed list proportional representation, with an electoral threshold of three percent of valid votes—which included blank ballots—being applied in each constituency. Seats were allocated to constituencies, corresponding to the provinces of Almería, Cádiz, Córdoba, Granada, Huelva, Jaén, Málaga and Seville, with each being allocated an initial minimum of eight seats and the remaining 45 being distributed in proportion to their populations (provided that the number of seats in each province did not exceed two times that of any other).

The use of the D'Hondt method might result in a higher effective threshold, depending on the district magnitude.

Election date
The term of the Parliament of Andalusia expired four years after the date of its previous election, unless it was dissolved earlier. The election decree was required to be issued no later than the twenty-fifth day prior to the date of expiry of parliament and published on the following day in the Official Gazette of the Regional Government of Andalusia (BOJA), with election day taking place on the fifty-fourth day from publication barring any date within from 1 July to 31 August. The previous election was held on 22 March 2015, which meant that the legislature's term would have expired on 22 March 2019. The election decree was required to be published in the BOJA no later than 26 February 2019, with the election taking place on the fifty-fourth day from publication, setting the latest possible election date for the Parliament on Sunday, 21 April 2019.

The president had the prerogative to dissolve the Parliament of Andalusia and call a snap election, provided that no motion of no confidence was in process and that dissolution did not occur before one year had elapsed since the previous one. In the event of an investiture process failing to elect a regional president within a two-month period from the first ballot, the Parliament was to be automatically dissolved and a fresh election called.

Throughout the first half of 2018, opinion settled among opposition parties that Díaz would call a snap election by October–November 2018, several months ahead of schedule. On 3 July, ABC hypothesized on the actual chances of an early election taking place, dubbing it as a real possibility after considering that Díaz would seek to capitalize on the Spanish Socialist Workers' Party (PSOE)'s growing popularity in opinion polls, hoping to benefit from the disarray within the People's Party (PP) ranks—resulting from its national leadership contest—and Citizens (Cs)'s inability to react after the motion of no confidence which ousted Mariano Rajoy's government from power. During the summer of 2018, it transpired that Susana Díaz was considering to call an autumn election for 28 October. In early September it was commented that the date would be delayed until either 18 or 25 November, After Cs officially withdrew its confidence and supply support from the government on 7 September, leaving the PSOE in minority, 2 or 16 December became the more likely dates for the election to be held. On 8 October, Susana Díaz announced the Parliament's dissolution and confirmed 2 December as the regional election date.

Parliamentary composition
The Parliament of Andalusia was officially dissolved on 9 October 2018, after the publication of the dissolution decree in the Official Gazette of the Regional Government of Andalusia. The table below shows the composition of the parliamentary groups in the chamber at the time of dissolution.

Parties and candidates
The electoral law allowed for parties and federations registered in the interior ministry, coalitions and groupings of electors to present lists of candidates. Parties and federations intending to form a coalition ahead of an election were required to inform the relevant Electoral Commission within ten days of the election call, whereas groupings of electors needed to secure the signature of at least one percent of the electorate in the constituencies for which they sought election, disallowing electors from signing for more than one list of candidates.

Below is a list of the main parties and electoral alliances which contested the election:

Timetable
The key dates are listed below (all times are CET) instead):

8 October: The election decree is issued with the countersign of the President of the Regional Government after deliberation in the Government Council.
9 October: Formal dissolution of the Parliament of Andalusia and official start of ban period for the organization of events for the inauguration of public works, services or projects.
12 October: Initial constitution of provincial and zone electoral commissions.
19 October: Deadline for parties and federations intending to enter in coalition to inform the relevant electoral commission.
29 October: Deadline for parties, federations, coalitions and groupings of electors to present lists of candidates to the relevant electoral commission.
31 October: Submitted lists of candidates are provisionally published in the Official Gazette of the Regional Government of Andalusia (BOJA).
3 November: Deadline for citizens entered in the Register of Absent Electors Residing Abroad (CERA) and for citizens temporarily absent from Spain to apply for voting.
4 November: Deadline for parties, federations, coalitions and groupings of electors to rectify irregularities in their lists.
5 November: Official proclamation of valid submitted lists of candidates.
6 November: Proclaimed lists are published in the BOJA.
16 November: Official start of electoral campaigning.
22 November: Deadline to apply for postal voting.
27 November: Official start of legal ban on electoral opinion polling publication, dissemination or reproduction and deadline for CERA citizens to vote by mail.
28 November: Deadline for postal and temporarily absent voters to issue their votes.
30 November: Last day of official electoral campaigning and deadline for CERA citizens to vote in a ballot box in the relevant consular office or division.
1 December: Official 24-hour ban on political campaigning prior to the general election (reflection day).
2 December: Polling day (polling stations open at 9 am and close at 8 pm or once voters present in a queue at/outside the polling station at 8 pm have cast their vote). Provisional counting of votes starts immediately.
5 December: General counting of votes, including the counting of CERA votes.
8 December: Deadline for the general counting of votes to be carried out by the relevant electoral commission.
17 December: Deadline for elected members to be proclaimed by the relevant electoral commission.
27 December: Deadline for the parliament to be re-assembled (the election decree determines this date).
26 January: Maximum deadline for definitive results to be published in the BOJA.

Campaign

Party slogans

Leaders' debates

Opinion polls
The tables below list opinion polling results in reverse chronological order, showing the most recent first and using the dates when the survey fieldwork was done, as opposed to the date of publication. Where the fieldwork dates are unknown, the date of publication is given instead. The highest percentage figure in each polling survey is displayed with its background shaded in the leading party's colour. If a tie ensues, this is applied to the figures with the highest percentages. The "Lead" column on the right shows the percentage-point difference between the parties with the highest percentages in a poll.

Graphical summary

Voting intention estimates
The table below lists weighted voting intention estimates. Refusals are generally excluded from the party vote percentages, while question wording and the treatment of "don't know" responses and those not intending to vote may vary between polling organisations. When available, seat projections determined by the polling organisations are displayed below (or in place of) the percentages in a smaller font; 55 seats were required for an absolute majority in the Parliament of Andalusia.

Voting preferences
The table below lists raw, unweighted voting preferences.

Victory preferences
The table below lists opinion polling on the victory preferences for each party in the event of a regional election taking place.

Victory likelihood
The table below lists opinion polling on the perceived likelihood of victory for each party in the event of a regional election taking place.

Preferred President
The table below lists opinion polling on leader preferences to become president of the Regional Government of Andalusia.

Voter turnout
The table below shows registered vote turnout on election day without including voters from the Census of Absent-Residents (CERA).

Results

Overall

Distribution by constituency

Aftermath

Results analysis
As a result of the election, the ruling Spanish Socialist Workers' Party of Andalusia (PSOE–A) suffered a severe setback, plummeting in traditional strongholds where abstention rates skyrocketed and underperforming all opinion polls published throughout the campaign. Together with the left-wing Forward Andalusia (AA) alliance, which failed to garner the combined support of Podemos and United Left (IULV–CA) at the 2015 election, it commanded just 50 seats, five short of a majority, bringing the Socialists on the verge of losing the Regional Government after 36 years of uninterrupted rule. On the other hand, Citizens (Cs) and Vox capitalized on the People's Party (PP)'s decay, with Vox winning an outstanding—and unexpected—12 seats in the Parliament of Andalusia, making it the fifth largest party in the region (the third in the constituency of Almería, where it far exceeded the most optimistic of expectations). Together, right-of-centre parties commanded 59 out of the 109 seats in parliament. Concurrently, Vox's result signalled the first time a far-right party had won seats in a regional parliament in Spain since the country's return to democracy, following the death of longtime dictator Francisco Franco in 1975.

The election was also notable for the negative electoral performances of PSOE and PP, the worst for both of them in the Spanish democratic period: the PSOE–A lost 400,000 votes, 7.4 points of the share and 14 seats compared to 2015, whereas the PP lost a further 300,000, 6 points and 7 seats over their already dwindling results. Comparisons to previous elections were even bleaker: since 2008, each party had lost around 1 million votes, 20 points and over 20 seats, with PSOE and PP at barely half of the share they had commanded in the 2004 and 2012 elections, respectively. Together, the two previously dominant parties in Andalusia garnered around 49% of the share and 54% of seats.

Analysts and journalists were divided on the causes behind the PSOE's downfall. Some attributed it to discontent with the Sánchez government and his policy of seeking the parliamentary support of pro-Catalan independence parties in the Congress of Deputies after the vote of no confidence which ousted Mariano Rajoy from the central government, which would have prompted a high turnout from right-wing voters. Others, on the other hand, attributed it mostly to Susana Díaz's ruling style in Andalusia: high unemployment and rampant corruption, discontent with her government's management of the education and health services in the region, her role in the ousting of Pedro Sánchez in 2016, the subsequent PSOE's abstention to allow for Rajoy's investiture and her foiled attempt to become PSOE leader in 2017 were also said to have played a major role in the low PSOE voter turnout, together with a deep disenchantment and fatigue with the PSOE's 36-year spell in the Regional Government of Andalusia. Concurrently, the fragmentation within the centre-right to right-wing electorate was also noted as a remarkable event, as the PP's decades-long, unquestioned dominance over such spectrum came to an end.

Reactions
After results were known, regional and national PP leaders Juan Manuel Moreno and Pablo Casado hinted to an alliance of right-wing forces—including Vox—in order to expel the PSOE from the Regional Government. Concurrently, Cs leaders showed reticence to allying themselves with Vox, instead claiming their right to attempt to form a government of their own with PP and PSOE support "without ruling out any other options". Still incumbent President Susana Díaz urged for an alliance of democratic forces to form around her party in order to "build a firewall against the extreme right", but her chances of retaining power were regarded as slim. The PSOE leadership—headed by Prime Minister Pedro Sánchez, Díaz's long-time party rival—was not expected to support Díaz's continuity at the helm of the party in Andalusia if she was not able to maintain the Regional Government, while concurrently ruling out giving support to any hypothetical Cs government. Díaz ruled out a resignation as she "had won [the election]", reasserting her will to continue leading the PSOE–A and attempt forming a government with the support of any of the other parties but Vox.

Pedro Sánchez's first public reaction to the results was to assert that his government "will continue to promote a regenerative and pro-EU project for Spain. The results in Andalusia reinforce our commitment to defend the Constitution and democracy against fear". On 3 December, the day after the election, thousands gathered throughout the streets of several Andalusian capitals to protest "against fascist policies", after Vox's entry into parliament and its prospective influence in a new Andalusian government.

Within a few days from the election, both PP and Cs candidates, Juan Manuel Moreno and Juan Marín clashed on the issue of who should lead the Regional Government. The PP warned Marín that failing to support Moreno would mean a new regional election, anticipating that it would lead to a massive mobilization of PSOE–A voters who had abstained. The Cs leadership showed a willingness to enter negotiations with PP if it was to elect Marín as president, but the party was weary of having to rely on the support of far-right Vox and instead kept their offer for an—unlikely—support or abstention from the PSOE. The possibility that Vox could have an influence in any future government divided Podemos: the national leadership did not rule out easening a Cs government with PSOE support, whereas regional leader Teresa Rodríguez voiced her explicit opposition to such scenario.

Government formation

Throughout December 2018, PP and Cs started negotiations for a prospective centre-right coalition government between the two parties, which would depend on Vox's external support. Cs ultimately agreed to support Moreno as regional president in exchange for 50% of the regional ministries and the leadership of the Parliament of Andalusia, which on 27 December resulted in Cs's Marta Bosquet becoming only the second non-PSOE speaker of the Parliament of Andalusia. While Vox supported Bosquet, the party announced such a support did not imply they would automatically support a PP–Cs government without them being called into a formal negotiation with the two parties, which Cs refused to concede. Both PP and Cs had been negotiating a formal agreement made of 90 core proposals, some of which—such as their promise to fully apply gender equality laws or the approval of various measures aimed at violence against women-prevention—went against Vox's own electoral manifesto. Cs warned that such a document was not negotiable and that it would constitute the basis for any prospective agreement with Vox, whereas PP's Pablo Casado showed a willingness to make some concessions to Vox in exchange for support and agreed to bring the far-right party into the negotiations.

On 8 January 2019, Vox published a list of 19 demands in exchange for supporting a centre-right government, including cuts in the regional self-government, a repeal of regional legislation affording special protection to women and LGTBI groups, and the creation of new laws to protect bullfighting, hunting and "popular culture and traditions", as well as the deportation of 52,000 undocumented migrants and the elimination of public subsidies for "supremacist feminism" and for "Islamic associations". Both Cs and leading PP figures were reportedly shocked at the party's demands, which they saw as "unnaceptable" and "unnegotiable". Such demands, but also Casado's attempts to sympathize with Vox's stances, caused a particular outcry within the PP's most moderate ranks—which regarded Vox's positions as outrageous— but Casado's leadership sought to keep on the negotiation with Vox nonetheless and called for the critics to not intervene. This advice went unheeded as an increasing number of PP regional leaders joined in their open criticism of Vox's demands.

The Government of France of Emmanuel Macron, European ally of Cs leader Albert Rivera, was reported to be closely following the government formation process in Andalusia and warned, ahead of the 2019 European Parliament election, that allying with far-right parties could not be a choice. Amid mounting criticism, it was reported throughout the afternoon of 9 January that PP and Cs, on the one hand, and PP and Vox, on the other, had reached separate agreements to elect Juan Manuel Moreno as new regional president. Vox was reported to have renounced their most controversial demands, specially those on gender equality, in order to reach an agreement. The PSOE–A initially announced that Susana Díaz would run for investiture and called for Cs to join "a democratic bloc" against the far-right, whereas Adelante Andalucía showed a willingness to support any alternative candidate to prevent a Vox-influenced government. However, after the PP–Cs and PP–Vox agreements were formally confirmed, Díaz declined to attempt investiture and announced that she would lead the opposition to the new regional government. As a result, the date for Moreno's investiture was set for 15 and 16 January.

As a result of the investiture vote, Moreno was elected as new president of Andalusia, being sworn in on 18 January 2019. On 21 January, Moreno unveiled the composition of his new government, formed by 6 PP regional ministers—aside from himself—and 5 Cs members, with Cs leader Juan Marín being appointed as vice president.

Notes

References
Opinion poll sources

Other

2018 in Andalusia
Andalusia
December 2018 events in Spain
Regional elections in Andalusia